North Carolina elected its members August 9, 1821, after the term began but before the new Congress convened.

See also 
 1821 North Carolina's 4th congressional district special election
 1820 and 1821 United States House of Representatives elections
 List of United States representatives from North Carolina

Notes 

1821
North Carolina
United States House of Representatives